XHXL-FM is a radio station in Monterrey, Nuevo León. Broadcasting on 91.7 FM, XHXL is owned by Grupo Radio Alegría and is known as Premier 91.7.

History
The concession for XHXL was obtained on December 15, 1959 by Gonzalo Estrada Cruz.

On February 22, 2020, XHXL began stunting with a loop of "This Love" by Maroon 5. Two days later, the station flipped from its previous Rock FM identity to adult contemporary as Nova 91.7. The format lasted less than a year and was replaced with "Premier 91.7" on January 4, 2021; the Premier moniker had previously been used at the company's XHMG-FM 102.9.

External links
XHXL-FM on RadioMixer

References

Radio stations in Nuevo León